Ibbitson is a surname. Notable people with the surname include:

 John Ibbitson (born 1955), Canadian journalist
 Robert Ibbitson (fl. 1648–1654), English publisher

See also
 Ibbetson